Pat Heung South is one of the 31 constituencies in the Yuen Long District of Hong Kong.

The constituency returns one district councillor to the Yuen Long District Council, with an election every four years.

Pat Heung South constituency is loosely based on southern part of Pat Heung with estimated population of 20,545.

Councillors represented

Election results

2010s

2000s

1990s

References

Pat Heung
Constituencies of Hong Kong
Constituencies of Yuen Long District Council
1999 establishments in Hong Kong
Constituencies established in 1999